Potu is a village and municipality in the Goychay Rayon of Azerbaijan.  It has a population of 3,567. The municipality consists of the villages of Potu, Kürd, and Ulaşlı Şıxlı.

References 

Populated places in Goychay District